Imeko Afon is a Local Government Area in the west of Ogun State, Nigeria bordering the Republic of Benin. Its headquarters are in the town of Imeko at coordinates .

Location

The local Government was created from the old Egbado North Local Government in December 1996, during the military regime of General Sani Abacha.
The land is rolling, with small hills rising between 15 and 70 metres above sea level.  
The Yewa River runs through the area from North to South, with its tributaries, the rivers Oyan and Oha.
The LGA is bounded in the north by Oyo State, to the east by the Abeokuta North LGA, to the south by the Yewa North LGA and to the west it shares an international border with Benin. 

The Local Government is divided into ten political wards: Imeko, Afon, Ilara, Iwoye/Jabata, Idofa, Owode/Obada/Idi-Ayin, Moriwi / Matale /Oke-Agbede, Agborogbomo, Atapele and Kajole / Agberiodo.
The second largest settlement, Ilara, merges into Kanga in Benin.

People

The 1991 population census gave a population of about 118,339.
The people are mostly Yorubas of Ketu origin, but there are significant numbers of Ohori and Egun speaking people.
As a border community, other West African people live in the LGA, including a substantial number of Fulani nomads.

In March 2011, just before the April National elections, it was reported that a mass transfer of teachers disloyal to the Peoples Party of Nigeria (PPN) had begun in the LGA.

Economy

Farming is the main economic activity.
The vegetation is a mixture of savannah belt and sparse forest suitable for cattle raising, with the advantage of being free of Tse-tse flies. 
The climate is tropical, with a rainy season commencing around March and ending in November. The soil is fertile, and Cassava and Tomatoes are grown in large quantities. 
Cotton grown in the LGA supplies the Yaru, tread and textile industries in Benin Republic. Other crops are pepper, maize, groundnuts, yams, vegetables, cocoa, cashew and teak.
  
The LGA has 43 public primary schools and 6 secondary schools, and a number of private schools.
Tourist attractions include Celestial City, center of the Celestial Church of Christ, Imeko, Odosuuru waterfalls, Mount Boomu, Afon and Jabata Forest.
To encourage tourists the LGA is named the "virgin land", and in 2010 a  Imeko-Oke-Agbede-Iwoye road was being built.

References

Local Government Areas in Ogun State